Elegia is a genus of snout moths. It was described by Émile Louis Ragonot in 1887.

Species
 Elegia fallax (Staudinger, 1881)
 Elegia feminina Kemal, Kızıldağ & Koçak, 2020
 Elegia inconspicuella (Ragonot, 1888)
 Elegia miserabilis (Strand, 1919)
 Elegia omichleuta (Meyrick, 1934)
 Elegia relictella (Caradja, 1925)
 Elegia saecula Kemal, Kızıldağ & Koçak, 2020
 Elegia similella (Zincken, 1818)
 Elegia southi (West, 1932)

References

Phycitini
Pyralidae genera
Taxa named by Émile Louis Ragonot